William Moise (1922–1980) was a visual artist, primarily an abstract impressionist painter, working in a regionalist style.

In his art, Moise’s favorite subject was the landscape around him, in Downeast, Maine. In 1970, Moïse wrote and self-published The Taste of Color, Touch of Love:The Creative World of Abstract Impressionism, a guide to painting that features several very full color plates of his work. His paintings are among collections of the US State Department, The University of Maine, The College of the Atlantic, Movie Director Joseph E. Levine, Nelson Rockefeller.

Biography

Moise was born and raised in Carlinville, Illinois. He grew up with three sisters and his mother. All of his sisters entered professional theater, and his mother worked as costume designer for the University in Tampa. Moïse graduated with a BA in English from the University of the South in 1943. He served as an anti-aircraft gunnery officer in the Navy in both the Atlantic and the Pacific. He received his MFA from Columbia University in 1949.

In 1950, Moïse moved to Rangley, Maine to work as an assistant Dr. Wilhelm Reich the father of “body therapy.” In Maine, he met his wife, Wilhelm’s daughter Eva Reich. They settled in Hancock on an old farm during the 1950s. Eva and Moise divorced in 1973.

In 1972, the movie director Joseph Levine and four investors offered Moise living expenses for three years in exchange for 600 paintings.  The paintings were premiered in a New York Gallery and Moise appeared on the Mike Douglas Show. But soon after the first gallery showing, investors lost interest and parted ways.  Moise died at the age of 58 in 1980 on the tennis court.

Painting

One critic once said: ”Moise extends the line of the impressionists of a century ago, though his work is abstract, modern, not reactionary. Still his style embraces the perspective of Cezanne, the loveliness of Renoir, the emotionalism of Van Gogh, the vision of Monet”

Further reading

 The Taste of Color, Touch of Love: The Creative World of Abstract Impressionism

References

1922 births
1980 deaths
20th-century American painters
American male painters
American Impressionist painters
Columbia University School of the Arts alumni
Sewanee: The University of the South alumni
United States Navy personnel of World War II
20th-century American male artists